The Hellenic Ornithological Society (HOS) is a Greek non-governmental body exclusively concerned with the protection of wild birds and their habitats in Greece. It is a non-profit organisation founded in 1982 and is the Greek partner of BirdLife International.  It runs the Antikythira Bird Observatory.

References

External links 

 

Animal welfare organizations based in Greece
Ornithological organizations
Bird conservation organizations
Organizations established in 1982
1982 establishments in Greece